Daniel T. Rodgers is an American historian. He is an emeritus professor at Princeton University, and the author of several books.

Early life
Rodgers was born in 1942 in Pennsylvania. He graduated from Brown University in Engineering, and from Yale University with a Ph.D.

Career
Rodgers was Henry Charles Lea Professor at Princeton University until 2012. He was a Guggenheim Fellow in 2007.

His work appeared in Harper's.
He has written a history of social ideas across the last three decades of the twentieth century in the United States.

Awards
 1978 Frederick Jackson Turner Award, The Work Ethic in Industrial America
 1999 Ellis W. Hawley Prize, Atlantic Crossings
 1999 George Louis Beer Prize, Atlantic Crossings
 2011 Bancroft Prize, Age of Fracture

Works

References

External links

21st-century American historians
21st-century American male writers
Brown University alumni
Yale University alumni
Princeton University faculty
Living people
Year of birth missing (living people)
Bancroft Prize winners
American male non-fiction writers